John Eyre (12 April 1665 – 2 November 1715) of Brickworth, Wiltshire was an English lawyer and Whig politician who sat in the English   and   British House of Commons from between 1698 and  1715.

Eyre was the son of Sir Giles Eyre of Brickworth House and his wife Dorothy Ryves. He matriculated at Merton College, Oxford on 10 February 1682, and also entered Lincoln's Inn on 31 May 1682. He married Mary Williams of St. James in the Fields by licence dated 18 June 1687, and was called to the bar in 1688. His father, whose estate had considerable electoral influence, died in June 1695.

Eyre returned himself unopposed on the family interest as Member of Parliament for Downton at a by election on 23 May 1698 and then at the 1698 English general election. He was a Whig and initially a Country Whig. He was elected in a contest at Downton in the first general election of 1701 but in the second general election of the year stood down in favour of Sir James Ashe, 2nd Bt. After Eyre stood aside again in 1702, Ashe returned the favour at the 1705 English general election when Eyre was returned unopposed. He voted  for the Court candidate for  Speaker on 25 October 1705, and for the Court in the proceedings on the 'place clause' of the regency bill on 18 February 1706. He was returned unopposed in the  1708 British general election and voted for the naturalization of the Palatines in 1709 and for the impeachment of Dr Sacheverell in 1710. He was relatively inactive in Parliament after the 1710 British general election but voted against the French commerce bill on 18 June 1713.  He was returned again for Downton at the 1713 British general election and voted against the expulsion of Richard Steele on 18 March 1714. He was returned again at the 1715 British general election.

Eyre was an active lawyer throughout his life. He became a bencher of Lincoln's Inn in 1715, and died there on 2 November 1715 at the age of 50. He left all his real estates to his nephew Giles Eyre.

References

1665 births
1715 deaths
Alumni of Merton College, Oxford
Members of Lincoln's Inn
English MPs 1698–1700
English MPs 1701
English MPs 1705–1707
Members of the Parliament of Great Britain for English constituencies
British MPs 1708–1710
British MPs 1707–1708
British MPs 1710–1713
British MPs 1713–1715